Will This Make Me Good (stylized in capitals) is the second studio album by American musician Nick Hakim. It was released on May 15, 2020, under ATO Records.

Background 
In an interview for Discogs, Hakim was asked what music he listened to that influenced him during the album's creation, and he listed the following records: Free Your Mind... and Your Ass Will Follow (1970) by Funkadelic, There's a Riot Goin' On (1971) by Sly and the Family Stone, Comfort Woman (2003) by Meshell Ndegeocello, Love for Sale by Bilal, Journey Through the Secret Life of Plants (1978) by Stevie Wonder, Bandana (2019) by Freddie Gibbs and Madlib, A Quiet Farwell 2016-2018 by Slauson Malone, Black Woman (1970) by Sonny Sharrock, Sweet Exorcist (1973) by Curtis Mayfield, It’ll All Be Over by Supreme Jubilees, Fôrça Bruta (1970) by Jorge Ben, and DAMN. (2017) by Kendrick Lamar. He also cited the music of Robert Wyatt, Cities Aviv, MIKE, ESG, and, especially, the Parliament-Funkadelic collective.

Critical reception
Will This Make Me Good was met with "generally favorable" reviews from critics. At Metacritic, which assigns a weighted average rating out of 100 to reviews from mainstream publications, this release received an average score of 75, based on 7 reviews.

Track listing

References

2020 albums
ATO Records albums